Juan Antonio Gaudino (1893 in Turin – 25 March 1975 in Buenos Aires) was an Argentine racing driver.

Indy 500 results

References

Indy 500

1893 births
1975 deaths
Racing drivers from Turin
Argentine racing drivers
Indianapolis 500 drivers